The great counties or grand governorates were the primary territorial subdivisions of the Independent State of Croatia.
In 1941–1943, there were twenty-two of them, with the capital city of Zagreb serving as the twenty-third.

References

Sources

Independent State of Croatia
Former subdivisions of Croatia